Funk Uhr is a German language weekly television magazine published in Hamburg, Germany. Founded in 1952 it is one of the oldest magazines in the country.

History and profile
Funk Uhr was established in 1952. The magazine was part of Axel Springer SE and was also published weekly by the company. In 2013 the company sold the magazine to Funke Mediengruppe. It is published weekly by Mediengruppe Klambt on Fridays.

The weekly has its headquarters in Hamburg. It offers a comprehensive listings of both radio and television programs. However, the magazine also features articles on finance, insurance, health, environment, travel and leisure.

Circulation
The circulation of Funk Uhr was 1,674,092 copies between October and December 1994. In 2001 the weekly was one of the top television magazines worldwide with a circulation of 1,141,000 copies. The weekly sold 907,000 copies in 2003. Its circulation was 772,900 in 2006. During the fourth quarter of 2014 the circulation of the magazine was 453,550 copies. The magazine sold 315,914 copies between January and March 2020.

See also
List of magazines in Germany

References

External links

1952 establishments in West Germany
German-language magazines
Funk Uhr
Magazines established in 1952
Magazines published in Hamburg
Funk Uhr
Weekly magazines published in Germany